The Daytona Beach Golf Course is a municipal golf course, located at 600 Wilder Blvd. in Daytona Beach, Florida, United States. The facility is owned and operated by the City of Daytona Beach, and offers two courses, the North Course and the South Course.

Overview
In addition to the two parkland golf courses, the facility offers a lighted driving range, practice putting green, pro shop, and full-service restaurant. The complex is managed by John Cameron as General Manager, with Brian Jaquet as the onsite Golf Professional and Forrest Ensminger as Superintendent. Special programs are offered for Juniors, Ladies, and Seniors.

History
The Daytona Beach Golf Club was constructed in 1921. The South course remains true to the original layout, as designed by Donald Ross, one of the most significant golf course designers in the history of the sport. The course features live oaks, tall pines, and water hazards.

The North course was designed and built in 1966 by Amos "Slim" Deatherage, who was the club's head professional and manager at the time. In 1997 the course was redesigned by Lloyd Clifton, with all greens, bunkers, and tees being redone. The resulting course winds through dense live oak and pine, with more water hazards and more undulations on the greens.

Both courses have been rated as three stars (out of five) on average by Golf Digest magazine readers. GolfLink.com users have also rated both courses at three stars overall.

Tournaments
The Daytona Beach Golf Club is the home of the Embry–Riddle Aeronautical University "Eagles" Women's golf team, who use the courses for practice and intercollegiate matches. The Eagles are members of the National Association of Intercollegiate Athletics Region XIV and compete in the Florida Sun Conference. The Eagles hosted the 2002, 2003, and 2004 NAIA Women's Golf National Championship.

The Eagles women's team also host the annual "Bash at the Beach" golf tournament at Daytona Beach Golf Club. The 2008 tournament was held on the final weekend in March, with participating teams including the Bethune–Cookman University Wildcats, Jackson State University, Birmingham Southern, Seminole Community College, Florida Institute of Technology, University of Mobile, Webber International, Northwood University, Lindenwood University, Wellesley College, Spring Hill College, and Thomas University.

Course scorecards

References

External links

 Official website

Golf clubs and courses in Volusia County, Florida
Golf clubs and courses designed by Donald Ross
Buildings and structures in Daytona Beach, Florida
Sports in Daytona Beach, Florida
1921 establishments in Florida